Ardglen is a village on the Main North railway line and close to the New England Highway on the North West Slopes region of New South Wales, Australia.

History
A railway station was opened there on 13 August 1877 as Doughboy Hollow, which was later renamed Ardglen on 29 June 1893. No trace of the railway station now exists. The significant 488 metre single-track rail tunnel, Ardglen Tunnel, passes through the Liverpool Range south of the former rail station site. It is one of the very few remaining single-track tunnels in use.

This tunnel is at the summit of the line at the watershed, with ruling grades of 1 in 40 approaching in both directions. Bank engine(s are required for the heaviest trains.

Doughboy Hollow Post Office opened on 16 November 1877, was renamed Ardglen in 1893 and closed in 1983.

The former public school has now closed.

The NSW Railways has been operating a hard rock quarry for over 100 years near Ardglen village.

Ardglen is in the Liverpool Plains Shire local government area (LGA) and Buckland County.

Heritage listings 
Ardglen has a number of heritage-listed sites, including:
 Main Northern railway: Ardglen Tunnel

Demographics
Ardglen region had a population of 366 (49.5% male, 50.5% female). Approximately 97 families live in the area and 46.4% of those were couples with children, 8.2% were single parent families, while 46.4% of couples had no children.

In the 2006 Census, the most common form of employment for persons aged 15 years and over usually resident in and around Ardglen were sheep, beef cattle and grain farming 45.0% The median income for people living in Ardglen was $396 per week.

The 133 occupied private dwellings in and around Ardglen 39.8% are owned outright by their occupiers another 27.1% are being purchased (e.g. by mortgage) and 22.6% are being rented.

References

 
Mining towns in New South Wales
Liverpool Plains Shire
Main North railway line, New South Wales